Shalom Auslander (born 1970) is a prominent American novelist, memoirist, and essayist. He grew up in a strict, Orthodox neighborhood in Monsey, New York, where he describes himself as having been "raised like a veal", a reference to his strict religious upbringing. His writing style is notable for its existentialist themes, biting satire and black humor. His non-fiction often draws comparisons to David Sedaris, while his fiction has drawn comparisons to Franz Kafka, Samuel Beckett, and Groucho Marx. His books have been translated into over a dozen languages, and are published around the world.

Early life
Auslander was born and raised in Monsey, and attended Yeshiva of Spring Valley for elementary school, and then high school at the Marsha Stern Talmudical Academy in Manhattan. He lived briefly in Teaneck, New Jersey, and Brooklyn, New York, before moving to the small town of Woodstock, New York. In 2019, he moved to Los Angeles, "because I'm a schmuck".

Career
Auslander has published a collection of short stories, Beware of God (March 2006), a best-selling memoir, Foreskin's Lament: A Memoir (October 2007), and two critically acclaimed novels. His work, often confronting his religious Jewish background, has been featured on Public Radio International's This American Life and in The New Yorker. He has also written for Esquire Magazine, Gentlemen's Quarterly, The New York Times, and many others. He was a finalist for the 2003–2004 Koret Jewish Book Award for "Young Writer on Jewish Themes".

In "Foreskin's Lament", Auslander wrote of his mother, "who was the belle of the misery ball", and his father, who was angry and uncommunicative. As a child, he went through the house and destroyed all the pornography he found. As an adult, he rebelled against his religious upbringing.

In January 2012, Auslander published his first novel, Hope: A Tragedy, a finalist for the 2013 Thurber Prize, which envisions a homeowner in upstate New York finding an elderly and foul-mouthed Anne Frank hiding in his attic. It won the Jewish Quarterly-Wingate Prize (2013). In 2020, the novel was named by both American and British critics as "the funniest novel of the past decade". Leading British literary critic Andrew Holgate, retiring in 2022, named 'Hope: A Tragedy' one of the 23 Best Books of his 23-year long career.

Auslander wrote and created the Showtime television program, Happyish, which shot a pilot with Philip Seymour Hoffman, whom he met while adapting his novel, Hope: A Tragedy, for the screen. After Hoffman's death on 2 February 2014, it appeared that the TV project would be discontinued. However, it was subsequently re-cast, with Steve Coogan in the lead role, and premiered on 5 April 2015.

His novel, Mother for Dinner, tells the story of a family of assimilated Cannibal-Americans, tasked with consuming (as is their tradition) the body of their deceased mother. A dark comedy about the cost of identity politics and the weight of the past upon the present, it was called a "riotous dissection of cultural formation" by Publishers Weekly, and a "brilliant satire on tribalism" by Booklist. In the Wall Street Journal, Sam Sacks wrote: "Everyone has different ideas about what's funny, and for me, the gold standard is dark Jewish humor — the more masochistic and taboo, the better. This sort of joking is scarce today — cultural homogenization and the current moral panic over giving offense have turned it into something like samizdat — but at least we have Shalom Auslander." In the UK, the book was met with unanimous praise, with noted book critic Stuart Kelly calling it a "work of genius." Its omission from the Booker Longlist prompted an op-ed in The Times to ask, "But why no Mother for Dinner by Shalom Auslander, which is funny, in bad taste and a satire of identity politics?" 

In 2021, Auslander began a YouTube series entitled "UNGODLY: Good Lessons from a Bad God", which re-examines the Bible assuming God (cruel, short-tempered and vindictive) as the antagonist of the story, "as someone we should never be like." Done in a chapter-and-verse format, the goal is to eventually complete the Old and New Testaments.

In 2022, Auslander's essay on the life and work of Franz Kafka, "The Day Kafka Killed His iPhone," was awarded the Peter Gilbert Prize by the Woolf Institute at Cambridge University, England. The essay discusses the paradoxical need for the artist to be both involved in the world, and removed from it, in order to complete his or her work.

Personal life
Auslander is married to the artist and writer Orli Auslander, and currently resides in Los Angeles, California.

Partial list of works

Books
 Foreskin's Lament: A Memoir
 Beware of God: Stories (2005)
 Hope: A Tragedy (2012)
 Mother for Dinner: A Novel (2020)

Short stories / magazine articles
 The Los Angeles Times: This Year, God Should Atone to Us 
 The New Yorker: The Playoffs 
 The New Yorker: Save Us 
 The Guardian: Shalom Auslander's Top 10 Comic Tragedies 
 The Guardian: Interview 
 The 10 Types of Jew, Which One Are You? 
 Washington Post Op Ed: Don't Compare Trump to Hitler (It Belittles Hitler) 
 NPR, All Things Considered: The Groucho Letters 
 Tablet: Consider The Ostrich 
 The Los Angeles Times, Op-Ed: A Proud Fifth Columnist 
 TLS: Book Review, "Hasidism, A New History"

Radio interviews/readings
Fresh Air with Terry Gross, interview from 2007-10-08
 Death Camp Blues: from The Moth "Death Camp Blues"
 Shalom Auslander reads his true story, "The Blessing Bee." on This American Life
 Pretty Shitty Monkeys: An Interview with Shalom Auslander 
 Jessa Crispin: An Interview with Shalom Auslander

Television shows
 Happyish (2015)

YouTube
 UnGodly (2021)

References

External links

Interview on Bookslut (October 2007)
Ungodly YouTube channel

American male short story writers
American male novelists
American memoirists
American essayists
American male screenwriters
Living people
People from Monsey, New York
People from Teaneck, New Jersey
1970 births
People from Woodstock, New York
Jewish American short story writers
21st-century American Jews